Peter Leslie Weissberg  is a British physician.

Weissberg graduated from Birmingham University with an MBChB degree in Medicine 1976 and an MD degree Medicine in 1985.

Weissberg was appointed as the first British Heart Foundation Professor of Cardiovascular Medicine in the University of Cambridge in 1994. Weissberg became Medical Director of the British Heart Foundation in 2004. He has been an Honorary Consultant Cardiologist at Addenbrooke's Hospital in Cambridge since 1988.

Weissberg was awarded the honorary degree of Doctor of Science (DSc) by Birmingham University in 2013. He is a Fellow of the Royal College of Physicians and a Fellow of the Academy of Medical Sciences. He was appointed Commander of the Order of the British Empire (CBE) in the 2017 New Year Honours for services to medical research and cardiovascular health.

References

Alumni of the University of Birmingham
Living people
Fellows of the Royal College of Physicians
20th-century British medical doctors
21st-century British medical doctors
British cardiologists
Commanders of the Order of the British Empire
Fellows of Wolfson College, Cambridge
Year of birth missing (living people)